Rhayner Santos Nascimento (born 5 September 1990), simply known as Rhayner, is a Brazilian professional footballer who plays as an attacking midfielder for Sanfrecce Hiroshima in the J1 League on loan from Tombense.

Career
Rhayner started his professional career Grêmio Prudente where he left in the beginning of 2011.
On 15 May 2011, he joined the Brazilian Série A side Figueirense on a free transfer from Grêmio Barueri/Prudente, in Figueirense, he played 24 games total scoring 1 goal. In 2012, he tried his luck in São Paulo state championship on Linense, a local club. Also in 2012 Rhayner signed for Náutico, there he played 34 games and he made one goal! For the 2013 season he signed for Brazilian champion Fluminense.

Tombense
In March 2019, he joined Sanfrecce Hiroshima on loan until December 2019.

Career statistics
)

References

External links

Rhayner at playmakerstats.com (English version of ogol.com.br)

1990 births
Living people
Brazilian footballers
Association football midfielders
Campeonato Brasileiro Série A players
Campeonato Brasileiro Série B players
J1 League players
J2 League players
Grêmio Barueri Futebol players
Marília Atlético Clube players
Figueirense FC players
Clube Atlético Linense players
Clube Náutico Capibaribe players
Fluminense FC players
Esporte Clube Bahia players
Esporte Clube Vitória players
Associação Atlética Ponte Preta players
Kawasaki Frontale players
Tombense Futebol Clube players
Sanfrecce Hiroshima players
Yokohama FC players
Brazilian expatriate footballers
Brazilian expatriate sportspeople in Japan
Expatriate footballers in Japan